The Cable House and Station, also known as the Communications Center and Quarters, is a historic telecommunications building on Lincoln Street at Harbor Road in Sitka, Alaska.  It is a modest two-story building, about  square, with a hip roof.  The building housed the telecommunications hub of the Washington-Alaska Military Cable and Telegraph System (WAMCATS), a military communications network established in the first decade of the 20th century, during the period of the Alaska boundary dispute with neighboring Canada.

The building was listed on the National Register of Historic Places in 1979.

See also
National Register of Historic Places listings in Sitka City and Borough, Alaska

References

Communications in Alaska
Military facilities on the National Register of Historic Places in Alaska
Buildings and structures on the National Register of Historic Places in Sitka, Alaska
Telecommunications buildings on the National Register of Historic Places